Macrobrochis notabilis is a moth of the family Erebidae. It was described by Yasunori Kishida in 1992. It is found in Thailand.

References

Lithosiina
Moths described in 1992